Following is a list of dams and reservoirs in Texas.

All major dams are linked below.

Dams and reservoirs in Texas 

This list is incomplete.  You can help Wikipedia by expanding it.

 Addicks Dam, Addicks Reservoir, United States Army Corps of Engineers
 Amistad Dam, Amistad Reservoir, International Boundary and Water Commission
 Aquilla Dam, Aquilla Lake, USACE
 Barker Dam, Barker Reservoir, USACE
 Benbrook Dam, Benbrook Lake, USACE
 Buchanan Dam, Lake Buchanan, Lower Colorado River Authority
 Canyon Dam, Canyon Lake, USACE
 Choke Canyon Dam, Choke Canyon Reservoir, United States Bureau of Reclamation
 De Cordova Bend Dam, Lake Granbury, Brazos River Authority 
 Denison Dam, Lake Texoma, USACE
 Falcon Dam, Falcon International Reservoir, International Boundary and Water Commission
 Grapevine Lake Dam, Grapevine Lake, USACE 
 Ferrells Bridge Dam, Lake O' the Pines, USACE
 Inks Dam, Inks Lake, Lower Colorado River Authority
 Jim Chapman Dam, Jim Chapman Lake, USACE
 John T. Montford Dam, Lake Alan Henry, City of Lubbock
 Lake Conroe Dam, Lake Conroe, City of Houston, San Jacinto River Authority
 Lake Fork Dam, Lake Fork Reservoir, Sabine River Authority of Texas
 Lake J.B. Thomas Dam, Lake J.B. Thomas, Colorado River Municipal Water District
 Lavon Dam, Lake Lavon, USACE
 Livingston Dam, Lake Livingston, Trinity River Authority
 Lewisville Lake Dam, Lewisville Lake, USACE
 Longhorn Dam, Lady Bird Lake, City of Austin, Texas
 Lost Creek Dam, Lake Jacksboro, City of Jacksboro,_Texas
 Mansfield Dam, Lake Travis, Lower Colorado River Authority
 Medina Dam, Medina Lake, Bexar-Medina-Atascosa Water District
 Morris Sheppard Dam, Possum Kingdom Lake, Brazos River Authority
 Palmetto Bend Dam, Lake Texana, Lavaca-Navidad River Authority
 Lake Pflugerville, offstream storage, City of Pflugerville
 Olmos Dam
 Plunk Lake, Texas
 Joe Pool Dam, Joe Pool Lake, USACE
 Sam Rayburn Dam, Sam Rayburn Reservoir, USACE
 Red Bluff Dam, Red Bluff Reservoir, Red Bluff Water Control District
 Robert Lee Dam, E.V. Spence Reservoir, Colorado River Municipal Water District
 Rio Vista Dam, unnamed reservoir, City of San Marcos, Texas
 Sterling C. Robertson Dam, Lake Limestone, Brazos River Authority
 S.W. Freese Dam, O.H. Ivie Reservoir, Colorado River Municipal Water District
 Saffold Dam, unnamed reservoir, City of Seguin
 Sanford Dam, Lake Meredith, USBR
 Somerville Dam, Somerville Lake, USACE
 Stamford Dam, Lake Stamford, City of Stamford
 Max Starcke Dam, Lake Marble Falls, Lower Colorado River Authority
 Tawakoni Dam, Lake Tawakoni, Sabine River Authority of Texas
 Toledo Bend Dam, Toledo Bend Reservoir, Sabine River Authority of Texas (shared with Louisiana)
 Tom Miller Dam, Lake Austin, Lower Colorado River Authority
 Town Bluff Dam, Steinhagen Reservoir, USACE
 Twin Buttes Dam, Twin Buttes Reservoir, USBR
 Lake Waco Dam, Lake Waco, USACE
 Whitney Dam, Lake Whitney, USACE
 White Rock Dam, White Rock Lake, City of Dallas
 Wirtz Dam, Lake Lyndon B. Johnson, Lower Colorado River Authority
 Wright Patman Dam, Wright Patman Lake, USACE

See also
List of lakes in Texas

References 

Texas
Dams
Dams